Marcella Comès Winslow (born Marcella Rodange Comès; September 3, 1905 – July 6, 2000) was an American photographer and portrait painter. She was the official portrait painter of the United States Poet Laureate.

Life and education
Marcella Rodange Comès was born in Pittsburgh, Pennsylvania on September 3, 1905, one of three daughters of architect John T. Comès and his wife, Honora B. "Nora" Webber. She attended the Carnegie Mellon College of Fine Arts. She also trained in Europe. She had taught painting at Catholic University from 1965 to 1969.

She lived in Washington, D.C. and was active in the art scene. She was married to Colonel William Randolph Winslow, the son of Eben Eveleth Winslow and Anne Goodwin Winslow, who served in World War I and World War II. Comès raised their two children in Washington while he was stationed in England. Their home in Georgetown was a salon space frequented by literary figures of the time. Colonel Winslow died of pneumonia while serving in 1945.

Comès died on July 6, 2000, aged 94 or 95, and was buried in Arlington National Cemetery alongside her husband.

Career
Comès was the official portrait painter of the United States Poet Laureate. As official portrait painter, she painted portraits of Allen Tate, Elizabeth Bishop, Karl Shapiro, and Léonie Adams. She also painted portraits of Robert Lowell, Ezra Pound, Saint-John Perse, Caroline Gordon, Walter de la Mare, John Rothenstein, Denis Devlin, Juan Ramón Jiménez, Richard Eberhart, Robert Frost, Katherine Anne Porter, Anne Goodwin Winslow, Mark Van Doren, Robert Penn Warren, Eudora Welty, Walter Jackson Bate, and John Huston Finley.

She served as president of the Washington, D.C. chapter of Artists Equity Association and was vice president for the organizations' national association. She was involved as a member of the Corcoran Gallery of Art's Women's Commission.

Legacy
Her work is held in the collections of the Harvard Art Museums and the National Portrait Gallery. Her papers are held in the Archives of American Art.

Further reading
Winslow, Marcella Comès. Brushes With the Literary: Letters of a Washington Artist 1943–1959. Baton Rouge: Louisiana State University Press (1993).

References

External links
Oral history interview with Marcella Comès (Winslow), 1982 May 4 from the Archives of American Art

American portrait painters
American women painters
Carnegie Mellon University College of Fine Arts alumni
Painters from Washington, D.C.
Burials at Arlington National Cemetery
1905 births
2000 deaths
20th-century American women artists
20th-century American painters
Artists from Pittsburgh
Painters from Pennsylvania
American people of Luxembourgian descent
Place of death missing